The 1980 UK Championship (also known as the 1980 Coral UK Championship for sponsorship reasons) was a professional non-ranking snooker tournament that took place at the Guild Hall in Preston, England, between 16 and 29 November 1980. This was the fourth edition of the UK Championship and the third staging of the competition in Preston. The event was sponsored by Coral for the third consecutive year. The televised stages were shown on the BBC from 22 to 29 November – the BBC's television coverage had been extended to eight days after the success of other competitions such as the World Championship.

Steve Davis defeated Alex Higgins 16–6 in the final to win his first major title, after making his first major quarter-final in the previous year's championship. Davis whitewashed Terry Griffiths 9–0 in the semi-finals on his way to the final. The highest break of the tournament was a 134 made by Higgins.

Prize fund

Winner:   £6,000
Runner-up: £3,000
Semi-final: £1,500
Quarter-final: £1,000
Last 16: £500
Last 24: £250

Main draw

Final

Qualifying

Preliminary round   Best of 17 frames

 Kingsley Kennerley W/O Jackie Rea 

 Sid Hood 9–3 Chris Ross 

 Mike Hallett 9–8 Bernard Bennett Last 32  Best of 17 frames

 Tony Meo 9–5 Sid Hood 

 Mike Hallett 9–8 Ray Edmonds 

 Eddie Sinclair 9–1 Kingsley Kennerley 

 Joe Johnson 9–6 John Dunning 

 Jim Meadowcroft 9–1 David Greaves 

 Mark Wildman 9–8 Cliff Wilson 

 Roy Andrewartha 9–8 Tony Knowles 

 Rex Williams 9'''–1 John Barrie

Century breaks

 134, 109  Alex Higgins
 118  Tony Meo
 118  Willie Thorne
 114  Steve Davis
 102  Doug Mountjoy
 102  Ray Reardon

References

1980
UK Championship
UK Championship
UK Championship